FF med Bert (Föräldrafritt med Bert, FF, Berttidningen), was a Swedish comic book published between the years of 1993 and 2002. The main comics, Berts dagbok, were created by Johan Unenge and Måns Gahrton, and are based on the Bert Diaries by Anders Jacobsson and Sören Olsson. Bert Ljung's look is similar to the one of the books. Even comic albums were published. In the year 2000 the title was shortened to Bert, and the number of comics increased. Bert Ljung debuted as a comic character in 1993, as a guest comic in the Fantomen (Phantom) comic book.

Even other comics did guest appearances. Except for comics, reports aimed at young people (like interviews with sportspeople or pop and rock stars) were published.

References 

Swedish comics
1993 comics debuts
2002 comics endings
1993 establishments in Sweden
2002 disestablishments in Sweden
Comics based on novels
Gag-a-day comics
Fictional diaries
Comics set in Sweden